This is a list of corticosteroids (glucocorticoids and mineralocorticoids) or derivatives of cortisol (hydrocortisone). Most esters of these corticosteroids are not included in this list; for esters, see here instead.

The most common structural modifications in synthetic corticosteroids include 1(2)-dehydrogenation, 6α-, 9α-, 16α-, and 16β-substitution (with a halogen or methyl group), 16α,17α-acetonidation, and 17α- and 21-esterification.

Natural

 11-Dehydrocorticosterone (11-oxocorticosterone, 17-deoxycortisone) = 21-hydroxypregn-4-ene-3,11,20-trione	
 11-Deoxycorticosterone (deoxycortone, desoxycortone; 21-hydroxyprogesterone) = 21-hydroxypregn-4-ene-3,20-dione
 11-Deoxycortisol (cortodoxone, cortexolone) = 17α,21-dihydroxypregn-4-ene-3,20-dione
 11-Ketoprogesterone (11-oxoprogesterone; Ketogestin) = pregn-4-ene-3,11,20-trione
 11β-Hydroxypregnenolone = 3β,11β-dihydroxypregn-5-en-20-one 
 11β-Hydroxyprogesterone (21-deoxycorticosterone) = 11β-hydroxypregn-4-ene-3,20-dione
 11β,17α,21-Trihydroxypregnenolone = 3β,11β,17α,21-tetrahydroxypregn-5-en-20-one 
 17α,21-Dihydroxypregnenolone = 3β,17α,21-trihydroxypregn-5-en-20-one 
 17α-Hydroxypregnenolone = 3β,17α-dihydroxypregn-5-en-20-one
 17α-Hydroxyprogesterone = 17α-hydroxypregn-4-ene-3,11,20-trione
 18-Hydroxy-11-deoxycorticosterone = 18,21-dihydroxypregn-4-ene-3,20-dione 
 18-Hydroxycorticosterone = 11β,18,21-trihydroxypregn-4-ene-3,20-dione
 18-Hydroxyprogesterone = 18-hydroxypregn-4-ene-3,20-dione 
 21-Deoxycortisol = 11β,17α-dihydroxypregn-4-ene-3,20-dione, 
 21-Deoxycortisone = 17α-hydroxypregn-4-ene-3,11,20-trione
 21-Hydroxypregnenolone (prebediolone) = 3β,21-dihydroxypregn-5-en-20-one
 Aldosterone = 11β,21-dihydroxypregn-4-ene-3,18,20-trione
 Corticosterone (17-deoxycortisol) = 11β,21-dihydroxypregn-4-ene-3,20-dione
 Cortisol (hydrocortisone) = 11β,17α,21-trihydroxypregn-4-ene-3,20-dione
 Cortisone = 17α,21-dihydroxypregn-4-ene-3,11,20-trione
 Pregnenolone = pregn-5-en-3β-ol-20-one
 Progesterone = pregn-4-ene-3,20-dione

Note that the glucocorticoid activity of progesterone and 17α-hydroxyprogesterone is very weak (>100-fold less than that of cortisol).

The above list includes precursors and intermediates in corticosteroid biosynthesis.

Synthetic

Progesterone-type
 Flugestone (flurogestone) = 9α-fluoro-11β,17α-dihydroxypregn-4-ene-3,20-dione
 Fluorometholone = 6α-methyl-9α-fluoro-11β,17α-dihydroxypregna-1,4-diene-3,20-dione
 Medrysone (hydroxymethylprogesterone) = 6α-methyl-11β-hydroxypregn-4-ene-3,20-dione
 Prebediolone acetate (21-acetoxypregnenolone) = 3β,21-dihydroxypregn-5-en-20-one 21-acetate

In addition to the above, various progesterone derivative progestins such as chlormadinone acetate, cyproterone acetate, medrogestone, medroxyprogesterone acetate, megestrol acetate, and segesterone acetate possess weak glucocorticoid activity which can manifest clinically at high dosages.

Hydrocortisone-type
 Chloroprednisone = 6α-chloro-17α,21-dihydroxypregna-1,4-diene-3,11,20-trione
 Cloprednol = 6-chloro-11β,17α,21-trihydroxypregna-1,4,6-triene-3,20-dione
 Difluprednate = 6α,9α-difluoro-11β,17α,21-trihydroxypregna-1,4-diene-3,20-dione 17α-butyrate 21-acetate
 Fludrocortisone = 9α-fluoro-11β,17α,21-trihydroxypregn-4-ene-3,20-dione
 Fluocinolone = 6α,9α-difluoro-11β,16α,17α,21-tetrahydroxypregna-1,4-diene-3,20-dione
 Fluperolone = 9α-fluoro-11β,17α,21-trihydroxy-21-methylpregna-1,4-diene-3,20-dione
 Fluprednisolone = 6α-fluoro-11β,17α,21-trihydroxypregna-1,4-diene-3,20-dione
 Loteprednol = 11β,17α,dihydroxy-21-oxa-21-chloromethylpregna-1,4-diene-3,20-dione
 Methylprednisolone = 6α-methyl-11β,17α,21-trihydroxypregna-1,4-diene-3,20-dione
 Prednicarbate = 11β,17α,21-trihydroxypregna-1,4-diene-3,20-dione 17α-ethylcarbonate 21-propionate
 Prednisolone = 11β,17α,21-trihydroxypregna-1,4-diene-3,20-dione
 Prednisone = 17α,21-dihydroxypregna-1,4-diene-3,11,20-trione
 Tixocortol = 11β,17α-dihydroxy-21-sulfanylpregn-4-ene-3,20-dione
 Triamcinolone = 9α-fluoro-11β,16α,17α,21-tetrahydroxypregna-1,4-diene-3,20-dione

Methasone-type (16-methylated)

 Alclometasone = 7α-chloro-11β,17α,21-trihydroxy-16α-methylpregna-1,4-diene-3,20-dione
 Beclometasone = 9α-chloro-11β,17α,21-trihydroxy-16β-methylpregna-1,4-diene-3,20-dione
 Betamethasone = 9α-fluoro-11β,17α,21-trihydroxy-16β-methylpregna-1,4-diene-3,20-dione
 Clobetasol = 9α-fluoro-11β,17α-dihydroxy-16β-methyl-21-chloropregna-1,4-diene-3,20-dione
 Clobetasone = 9α-fluoro-16β-methyl-17α-hydroxy-21-chloropregna-1,4-diene-3,11,20-trione
 Clocortolone = 6α-fluoro-9α-chloro-11β,21-dihydroxy-16α-methylpregna-1,4-diene-3,20-dione
 Desoximetasone = 9α-fluoro-11β,21-dihydroxy-16α-methylpregna-1,4-diene-3,20-dione
 Dexamethasone = 9α-fluoro-11β,17α,21-trihydroxy-16α-methylpregna-1,4-diene-3,20-dione
 Diflorasone = 6α,9α-difluoro-11β,17α,21-trihydroxy-16β-methylpregna-1,4-diene-3,20-dione
 Difluocortolone = 6α,9α-difluoro-11β,21-dihydroxy-16α-methylpregna-1,4-diene-3,20-dione
 Fluclorolone = 6α-fluoro-9α,11β-dichloro-16α,17α,21-trihydroxypregna-1,4-dien-3,20-dione
 Flumetasone = 6α,9α-difluoro-11β,17α,21-trihydroxy-16α-methylpregna-1,4-diene-3,20-dione
 Fluocortin = 6α-fluoro-11β,21-dihydroxy-16α-methylpregna-1,4-diene-3,20,21-trione
 Fluocortolone = 6α-fluoro-11β,21-dihydroxy-16α-methylpregna-1,4-diene-3,20-dione
 Fluprednidene = 9α-fluoro-11β,17α,21-trihydroxy-16-methylenepregna-1,4-diene-3,20-dione
 Fluticasone = 6α,9α-difluoro-11β,17α-dihydroxy-16α-methyl-21-thia-21-fluoromethylpregna-1,4-dien-3,20-dione
 Fluticasone furoate = 6α,9α-difluoro-11β,17α-dihydroxy-16α-methyl-21-thia-21-fluoromethylpregna-1,4-dien-3,20-dione 17α-(2-furoate)
 Halometasone = 2-chloro-6α,9α-difluoro-11β,17α,21-trihydroxy-16α-methylpregna-1,4-diene-3,20-dione
 Meprednisone = 16β-methyl-17α,21-dihydroxypregna-1,4-diene-3,11,20-trione
 Mometasone = 9α,21-dichloro-11β,17α-dihydroxy-16α-methylpregna-1,4-diene-3,20-dione
 Mometasone furoate = 9α,21-dichloro-11β,17α-dihydroxy-16α-methylpregna-1,4-diene-3,20-dione 17α-(2-furoate)
 Paramethasone = 6α-fluoro-11β,17α,21-trihydroxy-16α-methylpregna-1,4-diene-3,20-dione
 Prednylidene = 11β,17α,21-trihydroxy-16-methylenepregna-1,4-diene-3,20-dione
 Rimexolone = 11β-hydroxy-16α,17α,21-trimethylpregna-1,4-dien-3,20-dione
 Ulobetasol (halobetasol) = 6α,9α-difluoro-11β,17α-dihydroxy-16β-methyl-21-chloropregna-1,4-diene-3,20-dione

Acetonides and related
 Amcinonide = 9α-fluoro-11β,16α,17α,21-tetrahydroxypregna-1,4-diene-3,20-dione cyclic 16α,17α-acetal with cyclopentanone, 21-acetate
 Budesonide = 11β,16α,17α,21-tetrahydroxypregna-1,4-diene-3,20-dione cyclic 16α,17α-acetal with butyraldehyde
 Ciclesonide = 11β,16α,17α,21-tetrahydroxypregna-1,4-diene-3,20-dione cyclic 16α,17α-acetal with (R)-cyclohexanecarboxaldehyde, 21-isobutyrate
 Deflazacort = 11β,21-dihydroxy-2'-methyl-5'H-pregna-1,4-dieno[17,16-d]oxazole-3,20-dione 21-acetate
 Desonide = 11β,16α,17α,21-tetrahydroxypregna-1,4-diene-3,20-dione cyclic 16α,17α-acetal with acetone
 Formocortal (fluoroformylone) = 3-(2-chloroethoxy)-9α-fluoro-11β,16α,17α,21-tetrahydroxy-20-oxopregna-3,5-diene-6-carboxaldehyde cyclic 16α,17α-acetal with acetone, 21-acetate
 Fluclorolone acetonide (flucloronide) = 6α-fluoro-9α,11β-dichloro-16α,17α,21-trihydroxypregna-1,4-dien-3,20-dione cyclic 16α,17α-acetal with acetone
 Fludroxycortide (flurandrenolone, flurandrenolide) = 6α-fluoro-11β,16α,17α,21-tetrahydroxypregn-4-ene-3,20-dione cyclic 16α,17α-acetal with acetone
 Flunisolide = 6α-fluoro-11β,16α,17α,21-tetrahydroxypregna-1,4-diene-3,20-dione cyclic 16α,17α-acetal with acetone
 Fluocinolone acetonide = 6α,9α-difluoro-11β,16α,17α,21-tetrahydroxypregna-1,4-diene-3,20-dione cyclic 16α,17α-acetal with acetone
 Fluocinonide = 6α,9α-difluoro-11β,16α,17α,21-tetrahydroxypregna-1,4-diene-3,20-dione cyclic 16α,17α-acetal with acetone, 21-acetate
 Halcinonide = 9α-fluoro-11β,16α,17α-trihydroxy-21-chloropregn-4-ene-3,20-dione cyclic 16α,17α-acetal with acetone
 Triamcinolone acetonide = 9α-fluoro-11β,16α,17α,21-tetrahydroxypregna-1,4-diene-3,20-dione cyclic 16α,17α-acetal with acetone

Others
 Cortivazol = 6,16α-dimethyl-11β,17α,21-trihydroxy-2'-phenyl[3,2-c]pyrazolopregna-4,6-dien-20-one 21-acetate
 RU-28362 = 6-methyl-11β,17β-dihydroxy-17α-(1-propynyl)androsta-1,4,6-trien-3-one

See also
 List of steroids
 List of corticosteroid cyclic ketals
 List of corticosteroid esters

References

Steroids
Corticosteroids